Nagayo Motoori (sometimes spelled Motohori) (本居 長世 ; 4 April 1885 – 14 October 1945) was a Japanese composer.

Biography

Selected works
"Tanpopo" (Dandelion, たんぽぽ), classical children's song to a poem by Shigeru Kuzuhara
"Akai Kutsu", children's song with lyrics by Ujō Noguchi
 (Blue-eyed doll), children's song with lyrics by Ujō Noguchi
, children's song with lyrics also by Motoori
Nanatsu no Ko, children's song with lyrics by Ujō Noguchi, recorded by Jean-Pierre Rampal and Ensemble Lunaire in 1978

References

1885 births
1945 deaths
20th-century Japanese composers
20th-century Japanese male musicians
Japanese male composers
Musicians from Tokyo